This is a list of currently active separatist movements in North America. Separatism includes autonomism and secessionism. What is and is not considered an autonomist or secessionist movement is sometimes contentious. Entries on this list must be movements that currently exist, which are seeking greater autonomy or self-determination for a geographic region.

 They are active movements with living, active members.
 They are seeking greater autonomy or self-determination for a geographic region.
 They are the citizen/peoples of the conflict area and do not come from other countries.
 
Under each region listed is one or more of the following:
 De facto state: for regions with de facto autonomy from the government
 Proposed state: proposed name for a seceding sovereign state
 Proposed autonomous area: for movements toward greater autonomy for an area but not outright secession
 De facto autonomous government: for governments with de facto autonomous control over a region
 Government-in-exile: for a government based outside of the region in question, with or without control
 Political party (or parties): for political parties involved in a political system to push for autonomy or secession
 Militant organisation(s): for armed organisations (sometimes called terrorist organisations)
 Advocacy group(s): for non-belligerent, non-politically participatory entities
 Ethnic/ethno-religious/racial/regional/religious group(s)

Antigua and Barbuda
 Barbuda
Proposed state:  Barbuda
Political parties:  Barbuda People's Movement

Canada

Regions and islands 

 Cascadia
 Proposed state: Republic of Cascadia
 Advocacy group: Cascadia Department of Bioregion
 Western Canada
 Proposed state: West Canada (Includes Alberta, British Columbia, Manitoba, and Northwest Territories)
 Political party: Maverick Party

Individual provinces 

 Alberta
 Proposed: Independence for Alberta
 Political parties: Independence Party of Alberta, Wildrose Independence Party of Alberta
 Saskatchewan
 Political party: Buffalo Party of Saskatchewan

 Quebec
 Proposed: Independence for Quebec or autonomy
 Civil organization: Saint-Jean-Baptiste Society, Mouvement national des Québécois et des Québécoises (MNQ), Rassemblement pour l'indépendance du Québec (RIQ), Les Intellectuels pour la souveraineté (IPSO), Mouvement de libération nationale du Québec (MLNQ), Réseau de Résistance du Québecois (RRQ)
 Political parties (secessionist): Parti Québécois, Bloc Québécois, Québec solidaire, Communist Party of Canada, Marxist–Leninist Party of Quebec, Climat Québec
 Political parties (autonomist): Coalition Avenir Québec, Équipe Autonomiste

political party: Progressive Nationalist Party of British Columbia

 Proposed: Autonomy for New Brunswick with the future possibility of independence. 
 Civil organization: New Brunswick FreeProvince Project

 proposed state: 
 political party: Newfoundland and Labrador First Party

 Prince Edward island
 proposed state: Prince Edward island
 political party: Green Island Republic

Movements to create new provinces/territories 

 Vancouver Island
 Proposed: breaking Vancouver Island off from British Columbia to create a new province
 Political party: Vancouver Island Party

Northern Ontario
 Proposed: Splitting Northern Ontario out as a separate province
 Political party: Northern Ontario Party

Labrador
 proposed: splitting Labrador of from Newfoundland and Labrador
 political party: Labrador Party

Denmark

 Proposed: Independence for Greenland
 Political parties: Inuit Ataqatigiit, Siumut, Naleraq and Nunatta Qitornai.

France

 Guadeloupe 
 Proposed state:  Guadeloupe
 Political parties: United Guadeloupe, Solidary and Responsible, Progressive Democratic Party of Guadeloupe

 Martinique
 Proposed state:  Martinique
 Political party:  Martinican Independence Movement

 Collectivity of Saint Martin
 Proposed: Unification with Sint Maarten to become Saint Martin
Advocacy group:Unification of Saint Martin

Mexico 

Autonomist movements

Chiapas
 Ethnic group: Mayans, Tzotzil
 De facto autonomous area:  Rebel Zapatista Autonomous Municipalities
 Militant organization: Zapatista Army of National Liberation
 Yucatán
 Ethnic group: Maya 
 Proposition: Definitive recognition of rights to ownership of traditional lands
 Defunct political party: Alliance for Yucatan Party
 Proposed state: Yucatán
Mixteca region
 ethnic group: Mixtecs
 proposed state: Mixteca region
 political party: Movimiento Ciudadano por la Autonomía de la Mixteca

Netherlands

Major Movements
 Aruba
 Proposed state:  Aruba
Political parties: People's Electoral Movement (Aruba), Concentration for the Liberation of Aruba
Referendums: 1977

 Curaçao

 Political parties: Movement for the Future of Curaçao, Sovereign People
Referendums: 1993 and 2005

Minor Movements

 Bonaire
 Proposed state:  Bonaire
Referendums: 1994 and 2004

 Saba
 Proposed state:  Saba
Referendums: 1994 and 2004

 Sint Eustatius
 Proposed state:  Sint Eustatius
Referendums: 1994, 2005 and 2014

 Sint Maarten
 Proposed state: Unification with Collectivity of Saint Martin to become  Saint Martin
Advocacy group: Unification of Saint Martin
Referendums: 1994 and 2000

Nicaragua 
Mosquito Coast
 Proposed state: Moskitia 
 Proposed: independence declared for the "Communitarian Nation of Moskitia"

Saint Kitts and Nevis

 
 Proposed state: 
 Political parties: Nevis Reformation Party (autonomist), Concerned Citizens' Movement (secessionist)

Trinidad and Tobago
Tobago
 Proposed: greater autonomy or independence for Tobago
 Political party: Tobago Organisation of the People, Progressive Democratic Patriots, Tobago Forwards, One Tobago Voice

United States

Regions 
 Cascadia
 Proposed state: Republic of Cascadia
 Advocacy group: Cascadia Department of Bioregion
 Republic of Lakotah proposal
 Proposed state: Republic Of Lakotah
 Advocacy group Lakota Freedom Movement

 Confederate States of America
 Proposed state: Confederate States of America or Southern United States or Dixie or Dixieland
 Advocacy groups: League of the South, other neo-Confederate groups

 Deseret
 Proposed state: Deseret
 Advocacy groups: Deseret nationalists (#DezNat), Mormons, White supremacists
 Aztlán 

 Racial group: Chicano Movement, Chicano
 Proposed state: Aztlan
 Advocacy groups: Brown Berets (Aztlanecas Brown Berets), MEChA (Movimiento Estudiantil Chicano de Aztlán, "Chicano Student Movement of Aztlán"),  Freedom Road Socialist Organization, which calls for self-determination for the Chicano nation in Aztlan up to and including the right to secession. Raza Unida Party (Defunct) United Farm Workers (Historically Sepratist) 

 New Afrika
 Proposed state: Republic of New Afrika
 Racial group: African Americans
 Proposed entity: Includes Louisiana, Alabama, South Carolina, Georgia, and Mississippi
 Advocacy group: Pan-Africanists
 
 New England
 Proposed state: Republic of New England
 Advocacy group: New England Independence Campaign

 Northwest Territorial Imperative
 Racial group: White Americans
 Proposed state: Northwest American Republic
 Advocacy groups: White supremacists

Internal Movements to create a new state 
Baja Arizona
 Ethnic group: southern Arizonans
 Proposed: combining Pima County and other southern counties of Arizona to create a separate state, Baja Arizona or Gadsden

States 

 Alaska
 Proposed state: Republic of Alaska
 Political party: Alaskan Independence Party
 California
 Proposed state:  Second Californian Republic/"New" California
 Ethnic group: Americans, Californios, Indigenous Californians
 Advocacy groups: Yes California, Californians for Independence
 Political parties: California National Party, California Freedom Coalition

 Texas
 Proposed state:  Republic of Texas
 Ethnic group: Americans, Tejanos
 Advocacy groups: Texas Nationalist Movement

 New Hampshire
 Proposed state: New Hampshire
 Advocacy groups: NHexit, Foundation for New Hampshire Independence, Free State Project

 Florida

 Proposed state: Florida
 Militant organization: Republic of Florida Militia
 Racial group: White Americans; White supremacists

 Vermont
 Proposed state:  Vermont Republic
 Political party: Vermont Independence Party Green Mountain Anarchist Collective (Anarchist)
 Advocacy group:  Second Vermont Republic

Territories
 Independence movement in Puerto Rico

 Political party: Puerto Rican Independence Party (PIP)
Advocacy groups: Puerto Rican Nationalist Party, Movimiento Independentista Nacional Hostosiano (MINH), Socialist Front (FS)
 Militant organization: Boricua Popular Army (Macheteros), Cadets of the Republic

United Kingdom
 Anguilla
 Proposed state:  Republic of Anguilla

 Bermuda
 Proposed state:  Bermuda
 Political party: Progressive Labour Party (Bermuda), One Bermuda Alliance (Historically), Gombey Liberation Movement

See also 
 List of historical separatist movements
 Lists of active separatist movements

References 

Separatist Movements, Active
Separatist Movements In North America, Active
North America
Separatist Movements In North America, Active